Trioza fletcheri is a sap-sucking bug species in the genus Trioza from the Punjab Province of Pakistan.

This species is a host for the parasitoid wasp Aprostocetus niger.

References

External links 

Triozidae
Insects described in 1912
Insects of Pakistan